Kenzie Kent (born March 13, 1996) is an American lacrosse attacker and ice hockey forward. She was drafted 4th overall by the Boston Pride in the 2017 NWHL Draft.

Career

Ice Hockey  
Across 157 games in the NCAA, Kent put up 138 points.

Lacrosse    

She was a three-time U.S. Lacrosse high school All-American. She went on to play 53 games for Boston College, getting 255 points. She won the 2017 ACC Athlete of the Year. In her final year, she served as team captain and was named an All-ACC First Team selection. After graduating, she joined the coaching staff of the Harvard Crimson.

International  

Kent played for USA Hockey at the 2013 IIHF World Women's U18 Championship and 2014 IIHF World Women's U18 Championship, winning two silver medals.

External links

References 

1996 births
Living people
Ice hockey players from Massachusetts
Lacrosse players from Massachusetts
Boston College alumni
American lacrosse players
People from Norwell, Massachusetts
Sportspeople from Plymouth County, Massachusetts
Boston College Eagles women's ice hockey players
College women's lacrosse players in the United States